The Ben-Tovim Walker Body Attitudes Questionnaire (BAQ) is a 44 item self-report questionnaire divided into six subscales that measures a woman's attitude towards their own body. The BAQ is used in the assessment of eating disorders. It was devised by D.I. Ben-Tovim and M.K. Walker in 1991.

Sub-scales
The six subscales measured by the BAQ are:
 Overall fatness
 Self disparagement
 Strength
 Salience of weight
 Feelings of attractiveness
 Consciousness of lower body fat

Foreign-language versions

Portuguese version
The BAQ was the first body attitudes scale to be translated into Portuguese. The validity of the Portuguese language version was proven in a test conducted on a cohort of Brazilian women who speak Portuguese as their native language. The test-retest reliability was 0.57 and 0.85 after a one-month interval. The test was conducted by Scagliusi et al.

Japanese version
The BAQ was translated into Japanese and tested on 68 males and 139 females in Japan and 68 Japanese males living in Australia (Kagawa et al.) The scores were assessed against 72 Australian men using the English-language version as well as scores from previous female Australian participants. There was a significant difference between the Japanese and Australian groups (p,0.05). The BAQ was deemed adequate for use in both Japanese males and females.

See also

 Body Attitudes Test
 Bulimia Test-Revised
 Eating Attitudes Test
 Eating Disorder Inventory
 SCOFF questionnaire

References

Eating disorders screening and assessment tools